Francis X. Katamba (born 1947) is a Ugandan-born British linguist. He is currently an emeritus professor at the Department of Linguistics and English Language of Lancaster University, United Kingdom. His research focuses on Luganda phonology and morphology, English phonology and morphology, morphological theory, phonological theory, and African linguistics.

Career 
Katamba received his PhD from the University of Edinburgh in 1974 with a dissertation entitled, "Aspects of the Grammar of Luganda." He has been a professor at Lancaster University since 2000.

Research
Katamba's research focuses on Luganda and English phonology and morphology.

He is credited for his work on inflectional phrase and Luganda tones. He had a long and fruitful collaboration with Larry Hyman investigating Luganda phonology .

Katamba claimed that exocentric compounds are headless - in other words they do not contain an element that can function as a semantic head in Morphology in 1993.

In his book, entitled Morphology and published in 2005, Katamba extended his analysis to other
areas in linguistics to have a grasp of the morphology of words, but also a better understanding of the relationship between 
morphology, phonology and semantics, in addition to an overview of sociolinguistics and psycholinguistics.

In a chapter on back-formation, published in the Encyclopedia of Language & Linguistics (Second Edition) in 2006, he investigated the most productive type of back-formations, hypocoristics.

Publications
Katamba has publications in several major journals such as English Language and Linguistics and Language.

Katamba has written numerous books entitled Introduction to Phonology (Longman, 1989), English Words (2nd edition, London: Routledge, 2005); Morphology (co-author John Stonham, London: Palgrave. 2nd ed. 2006) and he has edited several others, including Frontiers of Phonology, co-edited with Jacques Durand (Longman, 1995); Bantu Phonology and Morphology (Lincom Europa, Munich, 1995); Contemporary Linguistics: An Introduction 3rd ed. (edited with William O'Grady and Michael Dobrovolsky, London: Addison Wesley Longman, 1997) and Morphology: Critical Concepts. (London: Routledge. 6 volumes, 2004).

Bibliography

Books
Katamba, F. X. (2004). Morphology: Critical Concepts. Routledge.
Katamba, F. X., & Stonham, J. (2006). Morphology. (Modern linguistics series). Basingstoke: Palgrave.
Culpeper, J. V., Kerswill, P., Wodak, R., McEnery, T., & Katamba, F. (2018). English Language: Description, Variation and Context. (2nd ed.) London: Palgrave Macmillan.

Articles
Katamba, F. (1975). "Death and Man in the Earlier Works of Wole Soyinka". The Journal of Commonwealth Literature, 9(3), 63–71. doi:
Hyman, L. M. and Katamba, F. X. (1993). "A new approach to tone in Luganda". Language, 69. doi: 10.2307/416415
Hyman, L. M. and Katamba, F. X. (2005). "The word in Luganda". In Erhard Voeltz (ed.), Studies in African Linguistic Typology. Amsterdam: John Benjamins, pp. 171–194.
Katamba, F. X., Nurse, D. (Ed.), & Phillippson, G. (Ed.) (2002). "Review of H. J. Giegerich (1999) Lexical strata in English: morphological causes, phonological effects". English Language and Linguistics, 6(2), 379–416. doi: 10.1017/S1360674302230282

References

External links 
 

1947 births
Living people
Applied linguists
Morphologists
Linguists from the United Kingdom
Department of Linguistics and English Language, Lancaster University